Bow Island is a town in Alberta, Canada.

History 
The community of Bow Island received its first post-colonial families in 1900. In February 1910,  the Village of Bow Island was formed, and by March 1912 the village was declared the Town of Bow Island.

An island named "Bow Island" is located north of Grassy Lake near the confluence of the Bow River and the Oldman River, while a low depressional area named "Grassy Lake" is located south of Bow Island.

Bow Island was one of the first towns in Alberta to have natural gas wells and operated them until the franchise was sold to a private company.

In the early 1950s, irrigation was extended to the Bow Island area, and the town doubled in population. Bow Island is surrounded by 110,000 acres (445 km2) of highly productive lands. Some of the most modern irrigation systems in the world are located in the area; the first pivot and linear sprinkler systems in Canada were erected in the Bow Island area. A completely automated distribution system was installed in 1982 by the St. Mary River Irrigation District (SMRID), and it serves an area of 5,000 acres (20 km2). The system is known as the Lateral 12 System and has been toured by groups from around the world.

Geography 
Bow Island is located between the cities of Lethbridge and Medicine Hat. Its nearest community is the Hamlet of Burdett. The town of Bow Island sits inside of  Forty Mile County.

Demographics 

In the 2016 Census of Population conducted by Statistics Canada, the Town of Bow Island recorded a population of 1,983 living in 636 of its 682 total private dwellings, a  change from its 2011 population of 2,025.

Economy 
Bow Island is well known for its dry edible bean industry. A 5.5 metre (18 ft) tall statue of the mascot "Pinto MacBean" is located adjacent to Highway No. 3 and greets everyone coming into town. Bow Island is also the largest spearmint-producing region in Canada, with 4 farms in the surrounding area producing 25% of the North American demand for Scotch spearmint essential oil, used in flavouring candy, gum, mints and toothpaste.

A mustard seed processing facility was opened in Bow Island in 2019.  The site was originally the home of Spitz, which started producing sunflower seeds there in 1982.  Spitz was sold to PepsiCo in 2008, and production was moved out in 2018.

Arts and culture 
"Blues at the Bow Live", located in the historic Bow Theatre, is an internationally renowned live blues venue featuring Grammy and Juno Award winning blues artists. This nonprofit, solely volunteer operated Canadian blues society was formed in 1993. The society's first show to be held in the Bow Theatre took place on December 17, 1994. They have been hosting sold-out performances since inception. Blues at the Bow draws patrons from every corner of the province of Alberta and beyond.

Notable people 
Troy Loney, former professional hockey player
Clyfford Still, artist
Skyler Stromsmoe, professional baseball player
Nicholas Taylor, former Canadian senator

Climate

See also 
List of communities in Alberta
List of towns in Alberta
County of Forty Mile No. 8

References

External links 

1910 establishments in Alberta
County of Forty Mile No. 8
Latter-day Saint settlements in Canada
Towns in Alberta